The Birmingham King's Norton by-election of 1941 was held on 8 May 1941.  The by-election was held due to the death  of the incumbent Conservative MP, Ronald Cartland, who was killed on active service during the Dunkirk evacuation.  It was won by the Conservative candidate John Peto.

References

1941 in England
1941 elections in the United Kingdom
By-elections to the Parliament of the United Kingdom in Birmingham, West Midlands constituencies
1940s in Birmingham, West Midlands